Ķekava Parish is an administrative unit of Ķekava Municipality, Latvia. The administrative center is Ķekava village. Ķekava Parish is defined by Latvian law as belonging partly to the region of Vidzeme and partly to Semigallia.

Towns, villages and settlements of Ķekava Parish 
 Alejas
 Bērzmente
 Dzērumi
 Katlakalns
 Ķekava
 Misas
 Plakanciems
 Rāmava
 Valdlauči
 Vimbukrogs

References

External links

Parishes of Latvia
Ķekava Municipality
Vidzeme
Semigallia